Gröger is a German language surname originally frequent in Prussian and Austrian Silesia. It stems from a reduced form of the male given name Gregory – and may refer to:
Frieder Gröger (1934–2018), German mycologist
Friedrich Carl Gröger (1766–1838), north-German portrait painter and lithographer
Karl Gröger (1918–1943), Austrian member of a Dutch resistance group
Eduard Gröger (1827-1907), Austrian-Czech politician
Markus Gröger (1991), German footballer

References 

German-language surnames
Surnames from given names